Padesh is a village in Blagoevgrad Municipality, in Blagoevgrad Province, Bulgaria.
It situated in a valley in the Vlahina foothills 13 kilometers southwest of Blagoevgrad. There is a primary school "Todor Aleksandrov" and a cultural center "Smilen Seimenski" with a public library.

Padesh is the birthplace of the Mayor of Blagoevgrad Atanas Kambitov (GERB).

References

Villages in Blagoevgrad Province